Pieup (character: ㅍ) is a consonant of the Korean hangul alphabet. The Unicode for ㅍ is U+314D. It is pronounced aspirated, as [ph] at the beginning of a syllable and as [p] at the end of a syllable. For example: aspirated in 프랑스 peurangseu ("France"), but unaspirated in 앞 ap ("front").

Stroke order

References 

Hangul jamo